Malik Dinar was a native Indian slave who served as general in Khalji Dynasty of Delhi Sultanate. He served as subordinate officer Malik Kafur and was also a Shihna-yi pil or intendant of elephantry  and was sent by Kafur to suppress rebellion in Gujarat. His daughter has been married the third Khalji dynasty sultan, Qutb ud din Mubarak Shah. he was given the title 'Zafar Khan'(literally chief of victory).  The very same title which bestowed to one of greatest Khalji military general who repelled the Chagatai Khanate repeated invasions into India, Zafar Khan Malik Hizbaruddin.

References

Indian generals
Delhi Sultanate
Khalji dynasty
Year of birth unknown
Military history of India